The coastwise slave trade existed along the eastern coastal areas of the United States in the antebellum years prior to 1861. Shiploads and boatloads of slaves in the domestic trade were transported from place to place on the waterways. Hundreds of vessels of various sizes and capacities were used to transport the slaves, generally from markets of the Upper South, where there was a surplus of slaves, to the Deep South, where the development of new cotton plantations created high demand for labor. 

International tensions developed when ships were forced by weather or incident into ports in Bermuda and the British West Indies, as the British freed the slaves as part of the banned trade on the high seas, even before its abolition of slavery in its territories in 1834. There were several cases: Comet (1830), Encomium (1833), Enterprise (1835), Hermosa (1840), and, most notably, the Creole case of 1841, the result of a ship slave revolt that forced the vessel into Nassau, Bahamas. British officials freed the 128 slaves who chose to stay in the Bahamas.

Legal rights
Prior to 1807, the 1787 U.S. Constitution and the 1793 Fugitive Slave Act were the only national United States laws on slavery. Individual states had enacted laws authorizing and regulating slavery within their boundaries.

The multi-faceted 1807 Act Prohibiting Importation of Slaves abolished the "importation of slaves" from Africa, effective in 1808. The United States and Great Britain patrolled to create an international Blockade of Africa, trying to suppress the slave trade. In addition, US and British ships patrolled the Caribbean, where illegal slaves were generally brought for sale to the sugar plantations and smuggling into the U.S. 

The 1807 Act also regulated the United States' "coastwise slave trade"; it protected shipping by domestic slave traders between markets along the other slave trading coasts. Attorneys argued that ships at sea were an extension of U.S. sovereignty, which permitted domestic slave trade among the states.

Conflict between U.S. and Britain in the Caribbean
Complications developed between the U.S. and Great Britain from their differing interpretations of the application of laws against the slave trade in the Caribbean colonies. When American merchant ships were forced by weather or incident into ports in Bermuda and the British West Indies, the British freed the slaves as part of the banned trade on the high seas, even before its abolition of slavery in its territories in 1834. As early as 1825, the Home Office in London had ruled that "any slave brought to the Bahamas from outside the British West Indies would be manumitted, which led to 300 slaves owned by U.S. nationals being freed." In addition, slaves who escaped to the Bahamas from Florida became free.

Several cases occurred as anti-slavery agitation increased and abolition was passed: Comet (1830), Encomium (1833), Enterprise (1835), and Hermosa (1840) In each case, the British freed the slaves from the ships that had put into ports in Bermuda and the Bahamas, whether by weather or accident. 

The most notable case was the 1841 Creole, the result of a ship slave revolt that forced the vessel into Nassau, Bahamas. One of the slave leaders had heard of slaves being freed from the Hermosa there the previous year.

Holding that the slaves were free persons illegally detained in slavery, British officials ultimately freed the 128 of 135 slaves from the Creole who chose to stay in the Bahamas. It has been termed the "most successful slave revolt in U.S. history". The U.S. slaveholders feared this would encourage other slave ship revolts.

Selected list of laws and court rulings
The following are generally considered the most important United States statutory laws and case laws on slavery, in the order of their enactment:
1787: U.S. Constitution
1793: Fugitive Slave Act
1807: Act Prohibiting Importation of Slaves
1841: United States v. The Amistad
1850: Fugitive Slave Act
1857: Dred Scott v. Sandford
1865: 13th Amendment to the U.S. Constitution

Cabotage
The act of sailing along a coast and using landmarks for guidance is called cabotage, from the French word caboter ("to coast," "go from cape to cape").  When slaves were the merchandise being transported by cabotage, the practice was called the coastwise slave trade.

See also
 Enterprise (slave ship)
 Creole case 
 United States v. The Amistad (1841)
 Slavery in the United States
 Atlantic Creole
 Bristol slave trade
 Colonial South and the Chesapeake
 Scramble (slave auction)
 Seasoning (slavery)
 Tobacco colonies

References

Slavery in the United States
Pre-emancipation African-American history
British West Indies
History of Bermuda
Slave trade in the United States